Suess may refer to:

 Süß, a German surname transliterated as Suess
Eduard Suess (1831–1914), an Austrian geologist
Suess (lunar crater), named for the geologist
Suess (Martian crater), named for the geologist
Suess Glacier, a glacier in Canada named for the geologist
Suess Land, in Greenland named for the geologist
Hans Suess (1909-1993), an Austrian born American physical chemist, nuclear physicist and grandson of the geologist Eduard Suess
 Suess effect, a change in the ratio of the atmospheric concentrations of heavy isotopes of carbon noted by the chemist

See also
 Seuss (surname)
 Suss (disambiguation)
 Sues (disambiguation)